Steven Miller (born 13 March 1982) is a Scottish actor best known for his role as Lenny Lyons in the long-running British medical drama Casualty. He trained at the Bristol Old Vic Theatre School and is originally from Tillicoultry.
Other TV shows he has appeared in are Holby City, The Composer's Specials and The Bill.

Filmography

Theatre credits
 Paradise Lost
 Cargo
 Richard II
 Long Short and Tall
 Fiddler on the Roof
 Lord of the Rings
 Blackwatch
 2014 The Perfect Murder UK tour – Detective Roy Grace
 James I: The Key Will Keep the Lock
 Sunshine on Leith
 A Christmas Carol

References

External links
 

Scottish male television actors
1982 births
People from Stirling
Living people